Bob Kent is a former American football coach.  He served was the head football coach at Kalamazoo College in Kalamazoo, Michigan for the 1984 season, compiling a record of 1–8.

Head coaching record

References

Year of birth missing (living people)
Living people
Kalamazoo Hornets football coaches